Dahlia pinnata (D. × pinnata) is a species in the genus Dahlia, family Asteraceae, with the common name garden dahlia. It is the type species of the genus and is widely cultivated.

Description 
Dahlia pinnata is a perennial herbaceous plant with a rhizome and tuberous roots, reaching a height of 70 to 120, rarely 160 centimeters. The stem is erect being branched only in the inflorescence.  The leaves are usually simple, with leaflets that are ovate and 5–10 cm long. The plant is slightly shaggy.

The two to eight flower heads have a diameter of 6 to 10 centimeters on 5 to 15 centimeters long stems. The eight florets have a length of 3 to 5 centimeters, are ovate and coloured pink to deep purple.

Dahlias are mid-year to late-year season flowers that grow in a lot of various colors and forms.

Taxonomy 
Hansen and Hjerting in (1996) demonstrated that Dahlia pinnata should more properly be designated D. x pinnata. D. x pinnata was shown to actually be a variant of D. sorensenii that had acquired hybrid qualities before it was introduced to Europe in the sixteenth century and formally named by Cavanilles. The original wild D. pinnata is presumed extinct.

Distribution and habitat 
It is, geographically, located in Northern/ Central America and they tend to grow at borders. The plant occurs in Mexico in the mountains around Mexico City.

Ecology
The flowering period extends from July to October.

Pests and diseases 
Dahlias tend to attract quite a bit of insects, some which are dangerous and harmful to their survival. Insects like slugs, earwigs, the red spider, snails, caterpillars, aphids, and thrips threaten dahlias because they can eat the petals, leave slime trials, leave tattered petals, etc. Dahlias can also become infected with the following diseases: Sclerotinia disease, fungal diseases, mildew, Botrytis, Crown Gall, etc. If dahlias do become infected with these they can wilt, have spots on the leaves, the leaves can get irregular coloring/ patterning, etc.

Cultivation 
Used as an ornamental plant, and was cultivated by the Aztecs before the discovery of America, and was introduced to Spain in 1798. Modern dahlias are often the product of hybridisation between D. pinnata and D. coccinea. 
As cutflowers, dahlia have a long lifespan.

Besides being used for their outside appearance, dahlias tend to be used for their medicinal properties as well. This plant's roots contain some "nutritious inulin stored inside them" and they even have "antibiotic compounds concentrated in the skin of the tubers." This was so much so that this garden dahlia was before such an "important root crop and medicinal plant among the pre-Columbian Indians of central Mexico, Yucatan and Guatemala."

Dahlias prefer rich soil (pH level estimated at around 6.5- 7.5) with enough organic matter. The roots must be kept moist since they are very shallow rooted which means they usually become dry fairly frequently and quickly. They bloom around mid-summer through the beginning of winter, they are able to survive a light frost, but anything colder/harsher than that, they will not be able to keep thriving. When the harsh weather of winter is approaching, the dahlias should be dug up and stored in a safer place for them.

Many dahlia pinnata types can grow from seeds but more often they are cultivated by division of the tuberous roots or by stem cuttings. Providing the flower with some kind of plant food (mulch, growing media, nutrient food, etc.) can really make the dahlia healthier and more likely to survive.

References

External links

 Catalogue of Life
 Tela Botanica
 Dahlia pinnata

pinnata
Endemic flora of Mexico
Flora of Central Mexico
Garden plants of North America
Plant extinctions since 1500
Taxa named by Antonio José Cavanilles